Los Huemules de Niblinto National Reserve is a national reserve of Chile. It is located close to the northwest end of the Nevados de Chillán, in the upper Niblinto River basin. The reserve protects the northernmost population of South Andean deer.

References

National reserves of Chile
Protected areas of Ñuble Region